François Lemieux (born October 5, 1937) is a judge currently serving on the Federal Court of Canada.

References

1937 births
Living people
Judges of the Federal Court of Canada
People from Toronto